Robert T. Powers is an American mathematician.

Powers earned his doctorate from Princeton University and taught at the University of Pennsylvania. In 2012, he was elected an inaugural fellow of the American Mathematical Society.

References

Princeton University alumni
Year of birth missing (living people)
Living people
Fellows of the American Mathematical Society
University of Pennsylvania faculty
Mathematicians at the University of Pennsylvania
20th-century American mathematicians
21st-century American mathematicians